Suupohja  is a subdivision of Southern Ostrobothnia and one of the Sub-regions of Finland since 2009.

Municipalities
 Isojoki
 Karijoki
 Kauhajoki
 Teuva

Politics
Results of the 2018 Finnish presidential election:

 Sauli Niinistö   61.6%
 Matti Vanhanen   11.2%
 Paavo Väyrynen   10.6%
 Laura Huhtasaari   8.9%
 Pekka Haavisto   3.1%
 Tuula Haatainen   2.1%
 Merja Kyllönen   2.1%
 Nils Torvalds   0.3%

Sub-regions of Finland
Geography of South Ostrobothnia